Boneh-ye Zangar (also Romanized as Boneh-ye Zangār) is a village in Esfandaqeh Rural District, in the Central District of Jiroft County, Kerman Province, Iran. At the 2006 census, its population was 25, in 8 families.

References 

Populated places in Jiroft County